Gabriel-Joseph-Marie-Augustin Ferrier (29 September 1847 in Nîmes – 6 June 1914 in Paris) was a French portrait painter and orientalist.

Biography
His father was a pharmacist. He began his studies at the École des Beaux-Arts, where he worked with Ernest Hébert and Isidore Pils. His first exhibit was at the Salon in 1869. Two years later, he was awarded the Prix de Rome for his depiction of a scene from the Flood and studied at the French Academy in Rome from 1873 to 1876.

Upon returning to France, he specialized in painting portraits of notable figures connected with the Third Republic. In 1883, he took an extended trip to Algeria, where he created works in the Orientalist style. Some of those works earned him a Gold Medal at the Exposition Universelle (1889).

He later was named a Professor of Design at the Maison d'éducation de la Légion d'honneur, then became a lecturer at the École des Beaux-arts, succeeding Jean-Léon Gérôme. He also taught at the Académie Julian. In 1906, he was elected to the Académie des Beaux-Arts. He was also a member of the Société des Artistes Français. In 1911, he became a Knight in the Légion d'honneur.

Among his best-known students may be numbered Paul-Émile Bécat, Roger Bissière, André Fau, Luis Ricardo Falero and Albert Lynch.

Selected paintings

References

External links

 ArtNet: More works by Ferrier.
 Obituary from American Art News @ JStor

19th-century French painters
1847 births
1914 deaths
Orientalist painters
Portrait painters
People from Nîmes
Academic staff of the Académie Julian
Recipients of the Legion of Honour
Prix de Rome for painting
20th-century French painters